Natali may refer to:

 Natali Vineyards
 Natali (name), list of people with the given name
 Natali (surname), list of people with the surname
 Little Natali
 Natali (singer)